Kabebero is a settlement in Kenya's Central Province.

History 
The province is inhabited by the Kikuyu speaking community who are part of the Kenya Eastern Bantu.
During Kenya's colonization by the British, much of the province was regarded as part of the 'White Highlands', for the exclusive use of the settler community. Therefore it saw political activity from the local communities who felt that they had an ancestral right to the land. This tension culminated in the 1950s with the Mau Mau rebellion; it saw the region placed under a state of emergency and the arrest of many prominent political leaders.

References 

Populated places in Central Province (Kenya)